Katha rungsi is a moth of the family Erebidae first described by Hervé de Toulgoët in 1960. It is found in north-western Africa (Morocco), Portugal, Italy, Spain and Greece.

References

Moths described in 1960
Lithosiina
Moths of Europe